Senate elections were held in Turkey on 15 October 1961. In this election 150 members of the senate were elected by first-past-the-post system. The result was surprising because the party with second greatest number of votes nationwide won twice as many seats as the leading party.

Results

References

Turkey
Turkey
Senate
Senate elections in Turkey